Hagazussa: A Heathen's Curse (an Old High German term for "Witch") is a 2017 horror film written and directed by Lukas Feigelfeld in his feature directorial debut, and produced by Feigelfeld and Simon Lubinski. The film takes place in a remote mountain village in the 15th-century Alps, and follows Aleksandra Cwen as Albrun, a goat-herder shunned by her fellow townspeople who finds herself in an uneasy friendship with a local villager.

The film, an international co-production between Germany and Austria, premiered at Fantastic Fest in Austin, Texas on 22 September 2017, and received a wide release in Germany on 17 May 2018. It received positive reviews from critics.

Plot
The film is divided into four acts: "Shadows", "Horn", "Blood" and "Fire" spelled in the rune alphabet of the Elder Futhark and in the modern Latin alphabet.

SHADOWS: A lonely young girl named Albrun lives with her goat-herding mother in the Alps of 15th century Austria. The identity of her father remains a mystery. One night, men disguised in goat skins and horns come to their cottage to bang on their door, call them witches, and insist they should be burned. Later, the mother takes ill and is visited by a doctor and nun from a nearby town. They discover she has bulbous growths located below her armpit and, considering her too far gone, they leave. Albrun is left alone to tend to her mother, whose physical and mental condition deteriorates rapidly, culminating in a sexual assault against her daughter. The mother runs out of the cottage into the winter night. In the morning, Albrun finds her mother's lifeless body covered with snakes in the woods.

HORN: Fifteen years later, Albrun still lives in the same cottage from her childhood, and is now a new mother to an infant girl. Albrun tends goats in the hills, milking them and sometimes displaying an intimacy with them while she masturbates. Albrun carries goat milk to town to sell, but is rejected by the townspeople (due to their superstitions) and confronted by some unruly boys who treat her as a pariah. The harassment is then interrupted by a passing townswoman, Swinda. Swinda treats Albrun kindly and comes by Albrun's cottage to say that the village priest (parson) would like to speak to her. They walk to town together.

The local church contains an ossuary, its walls lined with skulls and other bones. Albrun meets the parson, who tells her that he came there to bring faith to people like her who have difficult lives. He says, however, that her isolation and estrangement from others leads them to temptation that springs from sacrilege. As he hands Albrun her mother's polished skull, painted with flowers and greenery, he concludes, "To strengthen the faith of a religious community, it requires all sacrilege be cleansed." Albrun takes her mother's skull and places it in a corner of her cottage. She surrounds it with flowers and a candle. When a visiting Swinda notices it, she promptly leaves. In seclusion, Albrun hears voices from the woods, including that of her mother. The strange sounds continue as she masturbates. The next day, as Albrun was about to breastfeed her daughter, the infant suddenly refuses her nipple.

Later, Swinda takes her walking in the mountains, but Albrun becomes uneasy when Swinda warns her about "those who don't carry God in their hearts: the Jews and the heathens. They come in the night and like animals they take you, and then some months later you bear a child." On the way down the mountain, Swinda talks a local man into walking with them. After Swinda whispers something to the man, he turns to Albrun and embraces her. Swinda then throws Albrun to the ground and whispers, "It's disgusting how you all smell, your rotten stench." The man then begins raping Albrun as Swinda holds her down. After the rape, she returns home and finds that her goats have all been stolen except for one, which has been butchered and mutilated. Furious at her mistreatment, Albrun brings a dead rat to the local water source to poison the water and then urinates and menstruates into it. That night, Albrun lights a candle and communes with her dead mother's skull.

BLOOD: Albrun comes to town while holding her child, and she sees many dead bodies being transported away. On the way home, she stops in the wood and eats a mushroom, which causes hallucinations and psychosis. In the midst of this, she walks into the stagnant pond with her daughter, letting her drown. She sinks under the murky water with her eyes open.

FIRE: In her cabin, as Albrun sleeps, a snake travels over her body. She wakes and, ignoring the snake, hears her mother calling her name. She rises and approaches the fireplace, hearing her mother's labored breathing. She discovers the body of her drowned baby daughter, which she carried home with her, and is seized with grief and horror. She then places her dead daughter into the soup that is boiling on the fire and, with shaking hands, eats from it. She soon vomits violently and screams in horror as the mushroom-induced psychosis returns with even more intensity. She sees her mother and hears laughing. The shadows on the walls seem to move menacingly, causing her to flee the cottage. In the dusky morning light, now with opaque eyes, Albrun lies down and dies on the scenic mountaintop. Her body spontaneously combusts with the rising sun.

Curiosities
At the beginning of the film a traveler warns our protagonists to go back, because it was starting to get dark and he was afraid of meeting the “Perchta“, a sort of Alpine deity, who if you want to associate with a more familiar figure, could be something like the Befana, an italian folkloristic figure

Cast

 Aleksandra Cwen as Albrun
 Celina Peter as Young Albrun
 Claudia Martini as Mutter
 Tanja Petrovsky as Swinda
 Haymon Maria Buttinger as Dorfpfarrer (village priest)
 Franz Stadler as Sepp
 Killian Abeltshauser as Farmer
 Gerdi Marlen Simonn as Baby Martha
 Thomas Petruo as Doctor
 Judith Geerts as Nun

Production

Feigelfeld wrote, directed, and co-produced Hagazussa as his film school graduation project, partially financing it with crowdfunding donations. According to Feigelfeld:

The music for the film was composed by Greek dark ambient duo MMMD.

Release
Hagazussa premiered in Austin, Texas at Fantastic Fest on 22 September 2017. The film toured the international film festival circuit that year, screening at such events as BFI London Film Festival and the Brooklyn Horror Film Festival. It received a wide release in Germany on 17 May 2018, and later received a limited release in the United States on 19 April 2019 through distribution by Music Box Films's genre subsidiary Doppelgänger.

Reception
On review aggregator Rotten Tomatoes, Hagazussa holds an approval rating of 93%, based on 29 reviews, and an average rating of 7.5/10. Its consensus reads, "Hagazussa: A Heathen's Curse weaves a spooky supernatural story that should satisfy horror fans with more adventurous inclinations." On Metacritic, the film has a weighted average score of 72 out of 100, based on 6 critics, indicating "generally favorable reviews".

Stephen Dalton of The Hollywood Reporter called the film a "spooky, stylish, spellbinding debut", writing that "even if the open-ended story does not satisfy conventional genre rules, Hagazussa works very well as a spellbinding audiovisual symphony". Phil Nobile Jr., writing for Birth.Movies.Death., wrote "Visually stunning and narratively assured, [Hagazussa] presents its horror as the slowest of burns, its ambiguous, stark presentation of the supernatural eventually giving way to tangible, colorful revulsion". Brad Miska of Bloody Disgusting wrote that "Hagazussa is Germany's answer to The Witch that has stunning atmosphere mixed with brooding terror from start to finish". Noel Murray of the Los Angeles Times wrote that "for those who can embrace “Hagazussa” more as an experience than as a spook show, this film is utterly absorbing and hard to shake".

Dennis Harvey of Variety called the film "gorgeously unsettling", writing that "this enigmatic folktale-cum-horror is likely to flummox or even exasperate mainstream genre fans with its sparse plotting, slow pace, and near-impenetrable mysteries. But its mix of the poetical, repugnant, and phantasmagorical will weave a singular spell for more adventuresome, arthouse-friendly viewers". Nick Allen of RogerEbert.com gave the film 2 1/2 out of 4 stars, praising Feigelfeld's "precise vision" and Cwen's "intense performance", but calling the film "atmospheric and muted ... Those are noble values for a horror movie, but it's a shame they’ve lead to a frustrating genre pic that's just too dreary to be scary".

References

External links
 
 

2017 films
2017 horror films
2017 directorial debut films
2010s historical horror films
Austrian horror films
German horror films
Films about witchcraft
Films set in the 15th century
Films set in the Alps
Folk horror films
2010s German films